Cess (pronounced ) is a tax that is generally levied for promoting services like health and education. Governments often charge cess for the purpose of development in social sectors. The word is a shortened form of "assess". The spelling is due to a mistaken connection with census.

It was the official term used in Ireland when it was part of the United Kingdom of Great Britain and Ireland, but has been superseded by "rate". The term was formerly particularly applied to local taxation.

In the British Raj, it was applied, with a qualifying prefix, to any taxation, such as irrigation-cess and educational-cess. They are collectively referred to as "cesses" in government censuses: "land revenue and cesses".

In modern India, it refers to a tax earmarked for a particular purpose, such as education, and is levied as an additional tax on the basic tax liability.

In Scotland, it refers to the property tax that was enacted there in 1665 and continued to be levied until the 18th century.

The term is used by the rubber industry in Thailand to refer to rubber export tax, which funds that country's Office of Rubber Replanting Aid Fund.

It has also been used by the Jamaican Ministry of Agriculture and Fisheries to denote a tariff on imports.

References

Tax terms